Henry Alrives "Hank" Schmulbach (January 17, 1925 – May 3, 2001) was an American Major League Baseball player who was used as a pinch runner for the St. Louis Browns for one game on September 27, .

External links

1925 births
2001 deaths
St. Louis Browns players
Baseball players from Illinois
Sportspeople from East St. Louis, Illinois
Washington University Bears baseball players
Seaford Eagles players